João Marcos Lima Candido (born 11 May 2000) is a Brazilian professional footballer who plays as a forward for Portuguese club B-SAD on loan from Santa Clara.

Club career
João Marcos is a youth product of Vila Nova and Goiás. He was promoted to the senior team of Goiás in 2020. He made his professional debut with Goiás in a 2–1 Campeonato Brasileiro Série A loss to Grêmio on 30 November 2020, scoring his side's only goal. He moved to the United Arab Emirates with Al Wahda ahead of the 2021-22 season. He joined Al Dhafra on loan in January 2022 for the second half of the season. On 14 August 2022, he transferred to the Primeira Liga sided Santa Clara signing a 3-year contract.

On 31 January 2023, Marcos was loaned to B-SAD until the end of the 2022–23 season.

Career statistics

References

External links
 
 
 UAE Pro League profile

2000 births
Sportspeople from Tocantins
Living people
Brazilian footballers
Association football forwards
Goiás Esporte Clube players
Al Wahda FC players
Al Dhafra FC players
C.D. Santa Clara players
Belenenses SAD players
Campeonato Brasileiro Série A players
UAE Pro League players
Primeira Liga players
Liga Portugal 2 players
Brazilian expatriate footballers
Expatriate footballers in the United Arab Emirates
Brazilian expatriate sportspeople in the United Arab Emirates
Expatriate footballers in Portugal
Brazilian expatriate sportspeople in Portugal